The Quarantine Act 1721 was a health protection measure passed by the Parliament of Great Britain. During the 18th century, the age of empire and sailing ships in England, outbreaks of diseases such as the plague seemed to travel from country to country very rapidly. Parliament responded to this threat by establishing the Quarantine Act in 1721 (8 Geo, c.10).

Extract from the act
The first clause of the act reads:
Whereas the parliament begun and holden at Westminster in the ninth year of her late majesty Queen Anne an act passed, intituled. An act to oblige ships coming from places infected more effectually to perform their quarantine: and whereas Marseilles, and other places in the south of France, have for some time past been visited with the plague, which occasioned just apprehensions lest the infection might be brought into this kingdom from the places so infected, or other places trading or corresponding therewith, unless timely care were taken to prevent the same: and whereas it hath been found by experience, that the said act is defective and ineffective for the purpose intended, and the penalties inflicted by the same not adequate to the offenses there-by prohibited;  and some further provisions are necessary to be made, in case it should please Almighty God to permit these kingdoms to be afflicted with the plague; for remedy thereof; be it enacted. which is right

Summary
In simpler terms, this act made it mandatory for all ships and crew to undergo a complete quarantine of the ship’s cargo and crew to determine whether there was a threat to public health. If the ship was infected by a disease and the captain or any of the crew members knew and hid the information, they were subject to capital punishment. If a crew member was found to be infected they were to be sent to a “lazeret” until they were cured of the disease and deemed eligible for release. A lazaret, or quarantine station, was usually constructed on an island and was guarded by soldiers who were also confined to the island for fear of spreading the illness. If a person tried to escape, they also would be subject to capital punishment under the terms of that statute.

Amendment and repeal
Although the plague never reached England during the time the act was enforced, parliament continued to fear it, and the act was amended several times until it was finally repealed and replaced by the Public Health Act of 1896 (59 Vict, c.19). The Quarantine Act of 1721 repealed and replaced the Quarantine Act of 1710 which had been passed under the reign of Queen Anne (9 Anne, c.2). It was first amended in 1743 in response to an epidemic in Messina (17 Geo II). Parliament then changed it in 1788 so that it included the cargoes of the ships as well as the people aboard (28 Geo, c.34). With the approach of Cholera in 1831, England would rely on this act for the last time before it was repealed.

References

External links
 

Great Britain Acts of Parliament 1721
Quarantine